The House of Pahlen (Palen) is a German, Estonian, Russian, Lithuanian, Swedish and Baltic German noble family of Pomeranian origin.

History
The family probably originated from Pomerania, but in the beginning of the 15th century moved to Livonia. The first historical account of this family dates to 1290, when Johannes de Pala was Vogt at Turaida.

On 18 September 1679, Charles XI of Sweden granted a barony to five brothers of the family and all their descendants. In 1799, Emperor Paul I of Russia gave Peter Ludwig von der Pahlen and all of his descendants the rank of count.

By a decision of the Russian Empire in 1755 and 1865, most of the other members of the Pahlen family received the Russian baronial rank. Members of the branches with Russian baronial titles also live in Sweden, and they form part of the unintroduced nobility.

Notable family members
 Count Peter Ludwig von der Pahlen (Pyotr Alexeyevich, 1745–1826), Russian courtier, organizer of the assassination of Paul I of Russia
 Count Peter Johann Christoph von der Pahlen (Pyotr Petrovich; 1778–1864), Russian General of Cavalry, hero of the Patriotic War of 1812, Russo-Turkish War, 1828-1829 and the campaign against the November Uprising in Poland; son of Peter Ludwig
 Count Friedrich Alexander von der Pahlen (Fyodor Petrovich; 1780–1863), Russian diplomat, Governor-General of Novorossiya, and Plenipotentiary President of the Divans in the Danubian Principalities; son of Pyotr Alexeyevich
 Count Paul Karl Ernst Wilhelm Philipp von der Pahlen (Pavel Petrovich, 1775–1834), Russian General of Cavalry, hero of the Patriotic War of 1812; son of Paul Ludwig
 Baron Hans von der Palen (1740-1817), colonel, Russian statesman; brother of Pyotr Alexeyvich
 Baron Carl Magnus von der Palen (Matvey Ivanovich, 1776–1863), Major-General of Cavalry, hero of the Patriotic War of 1812
 Baron Arend Dietrich von der Pahlen (1738-1778), Russian military officer, friend of Mikhail Lermontov
 Count Magnus Konstantin Ferdinand von der Pahlen (Konstantin Ivanovich; 1833–1912), Russian statesman, hero of the Siege of Sevastopol (1854–1855), Pskov governor, Russian minister for justice (1867–1878); grandson of Pyotr Alexeyevich
Count Konstantin Johann Georg von der Pahlen (Konstantin Konstantinovich; 1861–1923), statesman, Privy Councillor, senator, Governor of Vilnius
 Count Alexis Friedrich Leonid von der Pahlen (Aleksei Petrovich; 1874–1938), Russian Lieutenant-General, White movement officer under Nikolai Nikolaevich Yudenich
 Emanuel von der Pahlen (4 July 1882 – 18 July 1952), astronomer with a lunar crater named after him

References

External links

 Pahlens 
 Pahlens in the All-Russian Genealogical Tree 
 Barons von der Pahlen 

Russian noble families
Swedish noble families
Baltic nobility
Baltic-German people
Swedish unintroduced nobility